Skull Snaps was an enigmatic funk group active between 1963 and 1973. The group is known for their mysterious origins and the anonymity of their members, with the identities of their members being unknown for most of their career and long afterward. Until 1970 they were known as The Diplomats, and released a number of singles with some success. Renamed Skull Snaps, they released an eponymous album on the small GSF label in 1973 before suddenly disappearing.

Ten12 Records re-united all the original members of Skull Snaps (Erv Littleton Waters, Sam O. Culley, and George Bragg) in 2005 in tandem with the band's first official release, "Snapped"/"I'm Your Pimp", since its 1975 single.

Under the direction of Skull Snaps frontman Erv Waters, Ten12 Records planned to release the entire Skull Snaps catalog on CD and DVD, with recordings from the original album plus five bonus tracks: "Al's Razor Blade", "Ain't That Lovin' You", "On Top of It", "Soul Makossa", and "She's the One".

Skull Snaps album

The Skull Snaps album contains drum breaks that have been sampled numerous times on various hip hop records. In 1989, hip-hop artist Stezo first sampled the opening drums from their song, "It's a New Day" on his work titled, "It's My Turn".

Since then, the now-familiar opening drum pattern of "It's a New Day" can be heard on songs by well-known acts such as Ol' Dirty Bastard, Das EFX, DJ Jazzy Jeff & the Fresh Prince, Eric B. & Rakim, Digable Planets, DJ Shadow, Rob Dougan, Stabbing Westward, the Prodigy, Panjabi MC, Suprême NTM, Linkin Park and others, many of whom sampled the drum pattern directly from the Stezo track, as he let the sample run "naked".

Tracklist

References

External links
www.skullsnapsradio.com
[ AllMusic Guide entry] on Skull Snaps (group)
 Ten12 Records on 2005 release Skull Snaps (album)

Musical groups established in 1963
American funk musical groups